Dimitrije Dimitrijević may refer to:

Dimitrije Dimitrijević (Yugoslav footballer)
Dimitrije Dimitrijević-Mita, Serbian guerrilla fighter